The County of Boulogne was a county within the Kingdom of France during the 9th to 15th centuries, centred on the city of Boulogne-sur-Mer. It was ruled by the counts of Flanders in the 10th century, but a separate House of Boulogne emerged during the 11th century. It was annexed by Philip II of France in 1212, after which it was treated as part of the county of Artois until it was finally annexed into the royal domain in 1550.

History
Boulogne was already a pagus within the kingdom of the Franks (pagus Bononiensis), but there are few records prior to the 11th century. A proverbially wicked count named Herrequin is recorded for the 9th century, but he may be legendary (see Herla, Erlking). It seems to have come under the rule of the counts of Flanders in the late 9th or early 10th century. In 886, bishop Gauzlin of Paris asked count Erkenger of Boulogne to solicit German help against the Viking raids. Erkenger lost all his possessions in 896, as he remained loyal to Charles the Simple. It may have been at this point that Baldwin II, Count of Flanders, gained control over Boulogne.

Eustace II of Boulogne accompanied William the Conqueror's invasion in 1066. Boulogne was also a major participant in the First Crusade; Eustace III of Boulogne's brothers, Godfrey of Bouillon and Baldwin of Bouillon, both became kings of Jerusalem, and Eustace himself was offered but declined the title.

Count Renaud of Boulogne joined the imperial side at the Battle of Bouvines in 1214, and he was defeated by Philip II of France.

Boulogne passed under nominal royal control in 1223 when it was given to Philip II's son Philip Hurepel. Hurepel revolted against Blanche of Castile when Louis VIII of France died in 1226. When Philip Hurepel died in 1235, Matilda continued to reign and in 1238 was married to Alphonse, second son of King Alfonso II of Portugal, and younger brother of King Sancho II of Portugal. Having become Afonso III of Portugal in 1248 and renounced his title of Count of Boulogne, Alfonse divorced her in 1253 due to her barrenness in favour of Beatrice of Castile.

Nevertheless, Matilda and Philip did have a son Alberic, and a daughter Joan who both survived. Alberic reportedly renounced his rights and went to England, for unknown reasons. Apparently he survived his mother and died in 1284, but presumably did not leave issue. Joan was married in 1236 to Gaucher de Châtillon, Count of Mortain (d. 1251). She predeceased her mother in 1252, and presumably left no surviving issue.

Consequently, after Matilda, her county of Boulogne then passed to Matilda's niece, Adelaide of Brabant and her husband William X of Auvergne.

Bertrand V de la Tour succeeded to the counties of Auvergne and of Boulogne in 1437. Through his son Bertrand VI de la Tour the County of Boulogne passed to his grandson, the last medieval count of Boulogne: Jean III de la Tour d'Auvergne. By his marriage to Jeanne of Bourbon-Vendôme, he left two daughters:
The eldest daughter, Anne of la Tour d'Auvergne, married John Stewart, Duke of Albany, however she died childless in 1524.
The youngest, Madeleine de La Tour d'Auvergne married Lorenzo II de' Medici and gave birth to Catherine de' Medici, who inherited both Auvergne and Boulogne due to the death of the childless Anne.

The representatives of the County joined in the Netherlands the Estates General of 1464 in Bruges. At the death of Charles the Bold the King of France claimed the end of the dependency of Boulogne from the County of Artois, causing new struggles against the Habsburg. The treaty of Senlis closed the problem: France lost Artois to the Empire, while the Habsburg renounced to Boulogne.

On the death of Jean III de la Tour d'Auvergne in 1501, Anne inherited the title Countess of Boulogne; however at her death the title passed to Madeleine's daughter Catherine de Medici since Madeleine herself had died in 1519. Catherine became Queen of France in 1549 and the title passed to the French crown.

Boulogne was attacked numerous times during the Hundred Years' War and occupied numerous time by the English: the last time from 1544 to 1550. In 1550 the Peace of Boulogne ended the war between England and France and France bought back Boulogne for 400,000 crowns. (See also the Sieges of Boulogne (1544–46)).

List of counts

House of Flanders 

 896–918 : Baldwin I (also count of Flanders)
 918–933 : Adelolf (son of Baldwin I)
 933–964 : Arnulf I (son of Baldwin I, also count of Flanders)
 964–971 : Arnulf II (son of Adalolf)
 971–990 : Arnulf III (son of)
 990–1025 : Baldwin II (son of)

House of Boulogne 

 1032–1049 : Eustace I (son of)
 1049–1087 : Eustace II (son of)
 1087–1125 : Eustace III (son of)
 1125–1151 : Matilda I (daughter of, married to Stephen of Blois, also Count of Blois, Count of Mortain, Duke of Normandy and King of England)

House of Blois 

 1151–1153 : Eustace IV (son of, also Count of Mortain)
 1153–1159 : William I (brother of, also Count of Mortain and Earl of Surrey)
 1159–1170 : Mary I (sister of, married Matthew of Alsace)

House of Alsace 

 1170–1173 : Matthew
 1173–1216 : Ida (daughter of, married Renaud of Dammartin, Count of Dammartin-en-Goële and Count of Aumale)
 1173–1180 : Matthew II
 1181–1182 : Gerard
 1183–1186 : Berthold

House of Dammartin 

 1216–1260 : Matilda II (also Countess of Clermont-en-Beauvaisis and Queen of Portugal by her two marriages, Countess of Mortain, Countess of Aumale and Countess of Dammartin-en-Goële, married)
 1223–1235 : Philip I (also Count of Clermont-en-Beauvaisis)
 1235–1253 : Afonso (also King of Portugal)

House of Auvergne 

 1260–1261 : Adelaide (Cousin of, married William III, Count of Auvergne)
 1261–1277 : Robert I (son of, also Count of Auvergne)
 1277–1314 : Robert II (son of, also Count of Auvergne)
 1314–1325 : Robert III (son of, also Count of Auvergne)
 1325–1332 : William II (son of, also Count of Auvergne)
 1332–1360 : Joanna I (daughter of, also Countess of Auvergne, married)
 1338–1346 : Philip II (also Count of Auvergne)

House of Burgundy

 1360–1361 : Philip III (son of, also Duke of Burgundy, Count of Auvergne, Count of Artois and Count of Franche-Comté)

House of Auvergne

 1361–1386 : John II (son of Robert III, also Count of Auvergne)
 1386–1404 : John III (son of, also Count of Auvergne)
 1404–1424 : Joanna II (daughter of, also Countess of Auvergne, married)
 1404–1416 : John IV (also Duke of Berry)
 1416–1424 : George
 1424–1437 : Mary II (cousin of, also Countess of Auvergne)

House of La Tour d'Auvergne 

 1437–1461 : Bertrand I (son of, also Count of Auvergne)
 1461–1497 : Bertrand II (son of, also Count of Auvergne)
 1497–1501 : John V (son of, also Count of Auvergne)

After the death of John V, Count of Boulogne, the County of Boulogne was integrated into the royal domain.

See also
County of Artois
County of Flanders
Siege of Boulogne (disambiguation)

References

 
9th century in France
Boulogne
Medieval France
Boulogne